Castellani is a surname of Italian origin meaning 'castellan'. Notable people with the name include:

 Aldo Castellani (1874–1971), Italian pathologist and bacteriologist
 Andrea Castellani (born 1972), former Italian rugby union player
 Bruto Castellani (1881–1933), Italian film actor of the silent era
 Cesar Castellani (died 1905), Maltese architect
 Christopher Castellani (b. 1972), American novelist
 Daniel Castellani (b. 1961), Argentine volleyball player
 Daniela Castellani (born 1975), Italian softball player 
 Enrico Castellani (1930–2017), Italian artist
 Giovanni Castellani (1888–1953), Italian archbishop and Vatican diplomat 
 Giulio Giacomo Castellani (1619–1694), Roman Catholic Bishop of Cagli 
 Gonzalo Pablo Castellani (born 1987), Argentine footballer 
 Iván Castellani (born 1991), Argentine volleyball player
 John Castellani (1926–2021), American basketball player
 Leonardo Castellani (1899–1981), Argentine author, poet, and theologian
 Leonardo Castellani (engraver) (1896–1984), Italian engraver mainly active depicting landscapes with chalcography
 Mario Castellani (1906–1978), Italian comic actor
 Massimo Castellani (born 1961), Italian diver
 Michel Castellani, French politician
 Raymond Castellani (born 1933), American actor and founder of the Frontline Foundation
 Renato Castellani (1913-1985), Italian film director and screenwriter
 Rocky Castellani (b. 1926), American boxer
 Rudolph J. Castellani (b. 1964), American neuropathologist
 Ryan Castellani (b. 1996), American baseball player
 Stefano Castellani (born 1992), Italian footballer 
 Valentino Castellani (b. 1940), Italian professor and politician; mayor of Turin 1993–2001

See also
Castellano (surname)
Castellani (goldsmiths)

Surnames of Italian origin